Balagtasan is a Filipino form of debate done in verse. Derived from the name of Francisco Balagtas, this art presents a type of literature in which thoughts or reasoning are expressed through speech. 

The first balagtasan took place in the Philippines on April 6, 1924, created by groups of writers to commemorate the birth of Francisco Balagtas. They made the first balagtasan with three sets of poets presenting a scripted defense. They based the form on earlier types of debates that also used poetic elements such as karagatan, huwego de prenda and, duplo.

Balagtasan is participated by two or more protagonists who engaged in a debate on a selected subject. Each protagonist are to express their views in verse and with rhyming. Refutations shall also be done in the same manner. A judge, known as the lakandiwa if male or lakambini if female, will decide the winner of the balagtasan. The judge shall also announce the winner in verse and with rhyming. The participants are also expected to impress before a watching audience. This is enlightened by the expression of poetic arguments but it can also provide entertainment through humor, extraordinary wit, and quasi-theatrical and dramatic expression.

References

External links
 Balagtasan (justa poética) / Jesús Balmori y Manuel Bernabé 

Philippine poetry
Debate types